George Alan O'Dowd (born 14 June 1961), known professionally as Boy George, is an English singer, songwriter, DJ, author and mixed media artist. Best known for his soulful voice and his androgynous appearance, Boy George has been the lead singer of the pop band Culture Club since the group's formation in 1981. He began his solo career in 1987. Boy George's music is often classified as blue-eyed soul, which is influenced by rhythm and blues and reggae.

Boy George grew up in Eltham and was part of the New Romantic movement which emerged in the late 1970s to early 1980s. His look and style of fashion was greatly inspired by glam rock pioneers David Bowie and Marc Bolan. He formed the Culture Club with Roy Hay, Mikey Craig and Jon Moss in 1981. The band's second album Colour by Numbers (1983) sold more than 10 million copies worldwide. Their hit singles include "Do You Really Want to Hurt Me", "Time (Clock of the Heart)", "I'll Tumble 4 Ya", "Church of the Poison Mind", "Karma Chameleon", "Victims", "Miss Me Blind", "It's a Miracle", "The War Song", "Move Away" and "I Just Wanna Be Loved". Boy George was the lead singer of Jesus Loves You between 1989 and 1992. He has performed with Culture Club in reunion shows since 1998, and began his career as a DJ in the late 1990s. Outside of music, Boy George has been involved in many activities, among them songwriting, DJing, writing books, designing clothes and photography. He has also made several appearances in television, most recently appearing as a contestant on the 22nd UK series of I'm a Celebrity...Get Me Out of Here! in November 2022, eventually finishing in 8th place.

As a solo artist, Boy George has released nine studio albums, five compilation albums and forty-eight singles. He has also released seven DJ albums, three EPs and a soundtrack album. His solo hit songs include "Everything I Own", "Bow Down Mister", "Generations of Love" and "Love Is Leaving". He was featured as a vocalist on the 1984 charity song "Do They Know It's Christmas?" and was the last artist featured on the song to record his lines. Boy George's music features several genres, including pop, new wave, soul, soft rock, disco and reggae. He has received several awards as a solo artist and as a member of Culture Club. In 2002, he was voted 46th in a BBC poll of the 100 Greatest Britons. In 2015, Boy George received an Ivor Novello Award from the British Academy of Songwriters, Composers and Authors for Outstanding Services to British Music.

Early life
Boy George was born George Alan O'Dowd at Barnehurst Hospital, Kent, England, on 14 June 1961 and raised in Eltham, the second of five children born to builder Jerry O'Dowd (born Jeremiah; 1932–2004) and Dinah O'Dowd (born Christina Glynn; 1939 – 13 March 2023). He was raised in a working-class Irish Catholic family; his father was born in England of Irish descent and his mother is from Dublin. He has one older brother Kevin, as well as two younger brothers Gerald and David and a younger sister Siobhán. Boy George also has an older half-brother Richard, who was born out of wedlock in Dublin in 1957 when his mother was just 18; she moved to London with him to start a new life and escape the stigma of being an unmarried mother.

Boy George has compared his family history to a "sad Irish song." His maternal grandmother was permanently taken from her family at age six after being found outside the family home alone, and placed into an Industrial School. His great uncle Thomas Bryan was executed by the British in 1921 during the Irish War of Independence. According to Boy George's mother, who published a memoir in 2007, Jerry O'Dowd was physically and mentally abusive and beat her even when she was pregnant with Boy George. Boy George said of his father, "He was a terrible father and a terrible husband." In 1995, Boy George's youngest brother Gerald, who has schizophrenia, was convicted of killing his wife in an episode of paranoia.

Boy George was a follower of the New Romantic movement, which was popular in the UK in the early 1980s. He lived in various squats around Warren Street in Central London. He and his friend Marilyn were regulars at Blitz, a London nightclub run by Steve Strange and Rusty Egan. The pop artists that inspired him were Siouxsie and the Banshees, Roxy Music, Patti Smith, and the two major glam rock pioneers, David Bowie, and T. Rex frontman Marc Bolan. On the impact of Bolan and Bowie on him, Boy George states,

Career

Culture Club

Boy George's androgynous style of dressing caught the attention of music entrepreneur Malcolm McLaren (previously the manager of the Sex Pistols), who arranged for Boy George to perform with the group Bow Wow Wow. Going by the stage name Lieutenant Lush, his tenure with Bow Wow Wow proved problematic with lead singer Annabella Lwin. Boy George eventually left the group and started his own band with bassist Mikey Craig. They were joined by Jon Moss (who had drumming stints with the Damned and Adam and the Ants) and then guitarist Roy Hay. Originally they were named Sex Gang Children, but settled on the name Culture Club, referring to the various ethnic backgrounds of the members.

The band recorded demos that were paid for by EMI Records, but the label declined to sign them. Virgin Records expressed interest in signing the group in the UK for European releases, while Epic Records handled the US and North American distribution. They recorded their debut album Kissing to Be Clever (UK No. 5, US No. 14,) and it was released in 1982. The single "Do You Really Want to Hurt Me" became an international hit, reaching No. 1 in multiple countries around the world, plus top ten in several more countries (US No. 2). This was followed by the Top 5 hit "Time" in the US and UK, and "I'll Tumble 4 Ya" which reached US No. 9. This gave Culture Club the distinction of being the first group since the Beatles to have three Top 10 hits in the US from a debut album.

Their next album, Colour By Numbers, was an enormous success, topping the UK charts and reaching No. 2 in the US. The single "Church of the Poison Mind" became a Top 10 hit, and "Karma Chameleon" was an international hit, peaking at No. 1 in 16 countries, and the top ten in additional countries. In the US it hit No. 1, where it stayed for three weeks. It was the best-selling single of 1983 in the United Kingdom, where it spent six weeks at No. 1. "Victims" and "It's a Miracle" were further Top 5 UK hits, while "Miss Me Blind" reached the Top 5 in the US.

The band's third album, Waking Up with the House on Fire (UK No. 2, US No. 26), was not as big a hit as its predecessors internationally, but still achieved chart success. The first single, "The War Song", was a No. 2 hit in the UK, but further singles performed below expectations. On 25 November 1984, Boy George provided a joint lead vocal role on the Band Aid charity single "Do They Know It's Christmas?" recorded at Sarm West Studios in Notting Hill, west London. He was the last solo artist to deliver his lines, at 6 pm, having just arrived in the studio from Heathrow Airport after a Concorde transatlantic flight. The song featured mostly British and Irish musical acts, with Boy George the second singer to feature after Paul Young sings the opening lines. It became Christmas number one and the best-selling single of 1984 in the United Kingdom. Proceeds from the song were donated to feed famine victims in Africa during the 1984–1985 famine in Ethiopia. Unlike many of the bands featured on the single, Culture Club did not perform at Live Aid in July 1985.

In 1986, Boy George performed a guest-starring cameo role in an episode of the television series The A-Team titled "CowBoy George". Also in 1986, Culture Club released their fourth album, From Luxury to Heartache (UK No. 10, US No. 32) which featured the hit single "Move Away". With Boy George's subsequent drug addiction, the underwhelming performance of their last two albums, a soured romance between band members shrouded in secrecy, and a wrongful death lawsuit looming, the group ultimately disbanded.

Reunions
In July 1998, a reunited Culture Club performed three dates in Monte Carlo and then joined the Human League and Howard Jones in a "Big Rewind" tour of the US. The following month, the band appeared on the Late Show with David Letterman and made an appearance in Britain, their first in 14 years. Later that year, the band hit the UK charts at No.4 with "I Just Wanna Be Loved" and later a top 25 hit with "Your Kisses are Charity". A new Culture Club album, Don't Mind If I Do, was released in 1999. In 2006, the band decided to again reunite and tour, but Boy George declined to join them. As a result, two members of Culture Club replaced him with vocalist Sam Butcher. Boy George expressed his displeasure. After only one showcase and one live show, the project was shelved.

On 27 January 2011, Boy George announced to the BBC that there would be a 30th anniversary Culture Club reunion tour sometime later in the year, and that they would be releasing a new album in 2012. Although the 2011 tour never took place, Culture Club did play two live concerts, in Dubai and Sydney, the latter being a New Year's Eve concert. On 20 May 2014, it was announced on Culture Club's official Facebook page the band were back together. A new picture of the four members was also posted, along with a list of 11 concert dates through the UK. Alison Moyet would be a special guest at the concerts. The band were scheduled to perform dates in America in 2014 before the UK tour in December.

The band was scheduled to tour New Zealand in 2016. Tickets were sold for performances in Christchurch and Auckland. In November 2016, in a pre-tour interview on TVNZ, Boy George walked out after the interviewer asked him about his 2009 criminal conviction. The band then cancelled its Christchurch performance, saying it was due to changes in its international touring schedule. Later in November, the December performance in Auckland was also cancelled.

Solo career: late 1980s

After the dissolution of Culture Club in 1986, Boy George entered treatment and was prescribed narcotics to treat his addiction to heroin. In 1987, Boy George released his first solo album, Sold, which garnered success in Europe. It spawned the UK singles "Everything I Own" (UK No. 1), "Keep Me in Mind" (UK No. 29), "To Be Reborn" (UK No. 13), and the title song, "Sold" (UK No. 24). The singles were also hits in various other European countries. The album's success, however, was not duplicated in America. This may have been due in part to the fact that Boy George was prohibited by US authorities from travelling to the United States for several years because of his British drug charges. He was therefore unable to be in America to help promote the album.

Boy George did score his first solo US Top 40 hit with the single "Live My Life" (US No. 40) from the soundtrack to the film Hiding Out. Tense Nervous Headache (1988) and Boyfriend (1989) would be his next two internationally released albums; however, these two albums would not be distributed in the US. Instead, Virgin Records selected several songs from each of these albums for a North American-only release called High Hat (1989). High Hat scored a US Top 5 R&B hit in "Don't Take My Mind on a Trip", produced by Teddy Riley. Boy George's next single in the UK was "No Clause 28 (Emilio Pasqez Space Face Full Remix)", a protest song against a legal provision (Section 28) introduced by Margaret Thatcher's Conservative government that prohibited the "promotion" of homosexuality by local authorities such as schools. The song was an underground acid house hit. In accepting the award for Best British Group from Boy George at the 1989 Brit Awards held at the Royal Albert Hall in London, Andy Bell of Erasure kissed Boy George on stage to cheers from the crowd, with Bell stating it was an act in protest against Section 28.

Solo career: 1990s

In 1989, Boy George formed his own record label, More Protein, and began recording under the name Jesus Loves You, writing under the pseudonym Angela Dust, a word play on angel dust. He released several underground hits in the early 1990s; "After the Love", "Generations of Love" and "Bow Down Mister", the last giving him a UK Top 30 hit in 1991. Inspired by his involvement in the Hare Krishna movement (ISKCON), Boy George had written the song during a trip to India. Another single, "One on One", featured a remix by Massive Attack. From March 1990 to April 1991, Boy George presented a weekly chat and music show on the Power Station satellite channel called Blue Radio. In 1992, Boy George had a hit with the Pet Shop Boys produced song "The Crying Game", from the soundtrack for the film of the same name. The song reached number 22 in the UK Singles Chart, and number 15 on the US Billboard Hot 100. Larry Flick from Billboard complimented Boy George's "genius reading" of the song. Dave Sholin from the Gavin Report commented, "It's been said again and again that all any performer needs is the right material to have a hit. Boy George is just the right singer to resurrect this song".

He has also enjoyed a second career as a notable music DJ. His first gig as a DJ was at Phillip Sallon's new nightclub, Planets, located in London's Piccadilly. In the 1990s he came to the attention of rave/house promoters Fantazia who asked him to mix 1 of the discs on the 2 volume in their new compilation series Fantazia The House Collection 2. This compilation was a success in the UK, going gold. The album was also sold to Sony for European-wide release. London nightclub Ministry of Sound hired him to compile one of their first CDs, which sold 100,000 copies. He then completed some compilations for them, four of them being the Annual I to IV. In 1993, Boy George was featured on the P.M. Dawn single "More Than Likely" which became a moderate hit in the UK and the US.

Boy George released the rock-driven album Cheapness and Beauty in 1995. The single "Same Thing in Reverse" became a minor US hit. The Unrecoupable One Man Bandit – Volume One was the next album release, first being sold on the internet only then distributed by independent labels. Another project from the time was a new group that would include Boy George and two long-time musicians, John Themis and Ritchie Stevens. Initially named 'Shallow', it was later renamed 'Dubversive'. The project took place in 1997 and was to include trip-hop, dub and reggae. The project was not picked up by any major labels but some of the songs were later included on the 2002 Culture Club Box Set.

On some other labels, several dance-oriented songs were released in various countries. For example, "Love Is Leaving" went Top 3 in Italy and "When Will You Learn" reached the top position in the Swiss charts. "When Will You Learn" was also nominated for the Best Dance Recording, at the Grammy Awards. In 1999, Boy George collaborated on songs with dance-oriented acts. For example, "Why Go?", a slow-paced track with Faithless, from their Sunday 8pm LP, was later released in a remixed form in some European countries and Australia. A track was done with Groove Armada, named "Innocence is Lost", but was only released on a promo 12" in 1999.

Solo career: 2000s
Boy George remained a figure in the public eye, starring in the London musical Taboo, based on the New Romantic scene of early 1980s England (Boy George did not play himself, opting instead to take on the persona of Australian-born performance artist Leigh Bowery). Boy George was nominated for a Tony Award for the "Best Musical Score" and Taboo was highly successful in London's West End, running for two years and receiving four Laurence Olivier Award nominations, though a heavily altered US production produced by Rosie O'Donnell in New York City was short-lived, running for 100 performances.

In 2002, Boy George released U Can Never B2 Straight, an "unplugged" collection of rare and lesser known acoustic works. It contained unreleased tracks from previous years as well as some ballads from Cheapness and Beauty and the Culture Club album Don't Mind if I Do. From 2002 to 2004, under the pseudonym "The Twin", Boy George experimented in electronica, releasing limited edition 7" singles and promo records. The limited releases included four 7" singles, one limited 12" single (for "Sanitised") and a promo CD, a 13-track album Yum Yum. Two years later, it was released via digital outlets such as iTunes. An album recorded in the spring of 2003 was also shelved. A collaboration with electronic combo T–Total, the album was a collection of covers of songs by David Bowie, John Lennon, Dusty Springfield, T. Rex and Eurythmics among others.

During 2003, he presented a weekly show on London radio station LBC 97.3 for six months. He wrote the foreword for a feng shui book called Practical Feng Shui by Simon G. Brown (published in 1998). He also appeared as a guest on the British comedy-talk show The Kumars at No. 42. In March 2005 he was the guest host for an episode of The Friday Night Project, for Channel 4 television.

In 2005, Boy George released Straight, the second volume of his autobiography. On his "More Protein" website, he also announced another album, also named Straight, for mid-2005. The album was never released but a four track sampler was released with the book of the same name. A reggaeton oriented EP was also planned for August 2006 but was never released. Some recent tracks were shared by Boy George himself in late 2006 and early 2007 on his YouTube account, his three Myspace pages and sometimes on his official site. In January 2007, Boy George released "Time Machine" on Plan A Records, a song co-written with Ivor Novello Award-winning songwriter Amanda Ghost who also co-wrote "You're Beautiful" with James Blunt.

Boy George has run his own fashion line for some years, called "B-Rude", which has shown at fashion shows in London, New York and Moscow. On 24 December 2006, Boy George appeared on a one-off BBC TV programme Duet Impossible in which he performed with himself from the 1980s and joked about his street cleaning.

Later in 2007, two electronica/dance collaborations were released in limited editions. In the spring, the track "You're Not the One" was remixed from an old demo and released with the dance combo "Loverush UK" reaching the top 20 in the UK dance chart. It was a digital-only release, available in many digital retailers like iTunes. Also on iTunes, a new collaboration with trip-hop/electro band Dark Globe, called "Atoms", was released on 19 November. The single contains eight versions, from the slow original to electro remixes by Ariya and Henrik Schwarz. Also in late 2007, an EP titled "Disco Abomination" appeared on the internet, available for download on several underground outlets. It included new remixes of tracks like "You're Not the One" from U.S. DJ EddieD, "Turn 2 Dust", "Love Your Brother", and covers of "Don't Wanna See Myself" and "Go Your Own Way". Most of the versions are remixes done by German producer Kinky Roland.

On 25 February 2007, Boy George was special guest DJ at LGBT nightspot, the Court Hotel in Perth, Australia. On 4 March 2007, he performed as a DJ at the Hordern Pavilion in Sydney for the Mardi Gras Festival. On 11 May 2007, he performed as a DJ at the launch party for the Palazzo Versace in Dubai, UAE. Boy George cancelled his planned 2007 October tour via an announcement on his official website. In 2007, he toured as a DJ, visiting many venues around the world.

Boy George played a special residency at the Shaw Theatre in London from 23 January 2008, followed by a full UK tour. In April 2008, The Biography Channel featured a documentary on the life of Boy George. The American tour which was planned for July/August 2008 had to be cancelled because he had been denied a United States visa due to a pending London court case scheduled for November 2008. On 2 July six concert dates in South America were announced. Boy George participated in RETROFEST held in Scotland in August 2008, and a 30-date UK tour took place in October/November 2008.

In 2009, he signed a new record deal subsequently releasing the album Ordinary Alien – The Kinky Roland Files in the autumn of 2010. The album consisted of previously recorded tracks mixed by long-time dance partner Kinky Roland. He took part in Night of the Proms, which is a series of concerts held yearly in Belgium, the Netherlands, Germany and Spain which consist of a combination of pop music and popular classical music (often combined).

Solo career: 2010–2020

Boy George's 2012 appearances included the Melbourne International Arts Festival in October, both as featured guest DJ and also performing with Antony Hegarty in the festival's presentations of Swanlights, the Museum of Modern Art's musical artwork commission, which had only been performed one night previously, at Radio City Music Hall in New York City.

June 2013 saw the release of a new song, "Coming Home". Mikey Craig, former bandmate in Culture Club, co-wrote the song with Boy George. It was written during the song writing sessions for his album This Is What I Do released in October 2013. It has been remixed by the likes of Marc Vedo and Kinky Roland. The artist listed for the song is Dharma Protocol featuring Boy George. A video was released on YouTube shot and directed by Boy George, though he did not appear in the video. It was set on the Epping Ongar Railway and starred Danie Cox, lead singer and guitarist of London-based band the Featherz.

On 19 August 2013, it was announced Boy George would release his new studio album of original material, This Is What I Do, his first in 18 years. The album was written by Boy George and long-time writing partners John Themis, Kevan Frost and Richie Stevens. Stevens produced the record at London's Cowshed Studios and it was released by Kobalt Label Services. The album also features writing collaborations with Youth, and a version of Yoko Ono's "Death of Samantha". It was mixed by Dave Bascombe and features a string of guest musicians including DJ Yoda, Kitty Durham, Ally McErlaine, MC Spee and Nizar Al Issa.

In 2015, BBC Four showed Boy George and Culture Club: From Karma to Calamity a film about a 2014 reunion, a new album, and a planned UK—US tour.

In January 2016, Boy George joined the fifth series of The Voice UK, replacing Tom Jones as a mentor. His final act, Cody Frost, finished third place overall. Boy George left the series after just one season and later went on to join The Voice Australia as a coach for its sixth season to replace The Madden Brothers. His final contestant, Hoseah Partsch, was the runner-up. He returned for the show's seventh season, in 2018, its eighth season, in 2019 where his final contestant, Diana Rouvas won the competition, and its ninth season in 2020. Boy George did not return for the tenth season.

In October 2016, Boy George performed David Bowie's "Starman" – nine months after his idol's death from liver cancer – along with the National Health Service choir, as part of Channel 4's Stand Up to Cancer UK programme. In 2017, Boy George participated in the last season of The New Celebrity Apprentice on NBC, in which he supported the charity Safe Kids Worldwide and came in second place. Also in 2017 he collaborated on Pitbull's album Climate Change.

In August 2017, Boy George signed a recording deal with BMG, reuniting him with his songwriting catalogue, as BMG had acquired the Virgin Records songwriters in 2012. 

In 2019, he joined Marc Almond and Chrissie Hynde as a vocalist on "Don't Go Changing Soho", a single by Jocasta's Tim Arnold for the Save Soho campaign.

On 2 and 26 March 2020, through his YouTube channel, Boy George respectively released (as videos) 2 new solo songs entitled "Clouds" and "Isolation" taken from his forthcoming album Geminis Don't Read The Manual which was due to be released later in the year, but was postponed. On 6 April 2020 on his own record label BGP (Boy George Presents) he released the Isolation Limited Edition 2-track CD Single (Catalogue No: BGP015) including the title track and a new "Spatial Awareness Meets The Boy Uptown Dub" mix of the track "Clouds". In 2021, he was a guest on the BBC's Paul Weller – Live at the Barbican, joining Paul Weller and conductor Jules Buckley for a version of The Style Council's "You're the Best Thing". In September 2021, he became a judge on the Irish talent show The Big Deal.

2022: I'm a Celebrity...Get Me Out of Here! 
In November 2022, he appeared as a contestant on the 22nd UK series of I'm a Celebrity...Get Me Out of Here!. During his appearance on the show, Boy George expressed discomfort about appearing on the show with former UK health secretary Matt Hancock, mentioning that his mother had been in hospital while the country was under a COVID-19 lockdown. He said that he would have withdrawn from the show had his mother died in hospital. 

During a bush tucker eating trial that he and Hancock were voted to participate in, Boy George told Hancock that he has "never voted Tory." In a conversation with Seann Walsh, Boy George said that he found Hancock "slimy and slippery" and later told Hancock that he found it difficult to "separate" the politician from the person. He was eliminated from the show on 22 November on the 17th day, finishing in 8th place.

Personal life and sexuality

In the 1980s, much was made of Boy George's androgynous appearance, and there was speculation about his sexuality. When asked by Joan Rivers in an interview on her show in 1983, "Do you prefer men or women?", Boy George replied, "Oh both." In 1985, when asked by Barbara Walters about his sexual orientation, Boy George said he was bisexual and had various girlfriends and boyfriends, in the past. He gave a famous, oft-quoted response to interviewer Russell Harty that he preferred "a nice cup of tea" to sex.

In his 1995 autobiography Take It Like a Man, Boy George stated that he was actually gay, not bisexual, and that he had secret relationships with punk rock singer Kirk Brandon and Culture Club drummer, Jon Moss. He stated many of the songs he wrote for Culture Club were about his relationship with Moss. In a 2008 documentary Living with Boy George, he talked about his first realisation he was gay, when he first told his parents, and why men fall in love with one another as well as with women.

As two of the biggest androgynous stars in music, Boy George and Annie Lennox appeared on the cover of Smash Hits magazine in December 1983, followed by the cover of Newsweek magazine in January 1984.

Concurrently with developing his career as a DJ in the late 1990s, Boy George adopted a macrobiotic diet, which he had been attempting to follow since 1988. In 2001, he published the Karma Cookbook, a macrobiotic cookbook co-written with Dragana Brown, whom Boy George met in 1986. By 2014, Boy George had become a raw vegan after years of occasionally trying the diet.

Boy George appeared on an episode of BBC television genealogy series Who Do You Think You Are? in 2018, on which it was revealed that he was related to executed Irish revolutionary Thomas Bryan, a member of the "Forgotten Ten". , Boy George has credited his practice of Nichiren Buddhism and chanting Nam Myōhō Renge Kyō for his newfound spiritual strength to remain sober. Boy George has said: "I'm Catholic in my complications and Buddhist in my aspirations."

Boy George has multiple tattoos, including a Christian cross on the side of his face and a Jewish Star of David tattooed on the top of his head. He has a tattoo of David Bowie on his right arm and one of Marc Bolan on his left. Boy George said in 2013 he was "quite drunk" when his head was shaved and tattooed. He said when he stopped drinking alcohol he lost the desire to have further tattoos on his head, finding it "too painful".

Drug abuse and legal troubles

By the late 1980s, Boy George had been struggling with heroin addiction for several years. He attempted to perform concerts while under its influence. Addictions to other drugs soon followed. Determined to save Boy George's life, his younger brother David made an appearance on UK national television and discussed Boy George's drug habit, which Boy George had been publicly denying at that time. In 1986, Boy George was arrested for heroin possession as part of "Operation Culture."

In 1986, keyboardist Michael Rudetsky, who co-wrote the song "Sexuality" on Culture Club's From Luxury to Heartache album, was found dead of a heroin overdose in Boy George's London home. Boy George's friend, Mark Vaultier, died after an overdose of methadone and Valium at a party. In December 1986, another friend, Mark Golding, died of an overdose, with Scotland Yard police stating there was no suggestion of foul play. During this period Boy George decided to seek treatment for his addiction.

In 1995, Kirk Brandon sued Boy George for libel, claiming that Boy George mentioned a love affair between them in Boy George's autobiography, Take It Like a Man. Boy George won the court case and Brandon was ordered to pay £200,000 to Virgin Records, EMI Virgin Music and the book publisher in costs. Brandon declared himself bankrupt, which resulted in Boy George paying over £20,000 in legal fees.

On 7 October 2005, Boy George was arrested in Manhattan on suspicion of cocaine possession and falsely reporting a burglary. Boy George denied that the drugs were his. In court on 1 February 2006, the cocaine possession charge was dropped and Boy George pleaded guilty to falsely reporting a burglary. He was sentenced to five days of community service, fined US$1,000 and ordered to attend a drug rehabilitation programme. On 17 June 2006, a Manhattan judge issued a warrant for the arrest of Boy George after he failed to appear in court for a hearing on why Boy George wanted to change his sentence for the false burglary report. Boy George's attorney informed the court that he had advised Boy George not to appear at that hearing. On 14 August 2006, Boy George reported to the New York City Department of Sanitation for his court-ordered community service. As a result of the intense media coverage, he was allowed to finish his community service inside the Sanitation Department grounds.

Assault and false imprisonment conviction
On 5 December 2008, Boy George was convicted in Snaresbrook Crown Court, London, of the April 2007 assault and false imprisonment of Audun Carlsen, a Norwegian model and male escort, who initially stood for a photography session with Boy George. Carlsen claimed that he had been handcuffed to a wall fixture and beaten with a metal chain during their next meeting, although Boy George has always maintained that only the handcuffing was true and that he never beat Carlsen. His defence attorney presented the effects of his long-term drug use as a mitigating factor. On 16 January 2009, Boy George was sentenced to 15 months' imprisonment for these offences. He was initially incarcerated at HM Prison Pentonville in London, but was then transferred to HM Prison Highpoint North in Suffolk. He was given early release after four months on 11 May 2009. He was required to wear an ankle monitor and submit to a curfew for the remainder of his sentence.

On 23 December 2009, while he was still on licensed release from prison following the conviction, Boy George had his request to appear on the seventh series of Celebrity Big Brother (to be broadcast on Channel 4) turned down by the Probation Service. Richard Clayton QC, representing the Probation Service, said Boy George's participation would pose "a high level of risk" to the service's reputation. Clayton argued that if he used the show to promote his status as a celebrity and earn "a lucrative sum of money" it could undermine public confidence in the criminal justice system.

Memoirs
HarperCollins published Boy George's first autobiography, Take It Like a Man, in 1995, co-written with Spencer Bright. The book was released at the same time as Boy George's solo album Cheapness and Beauty and dealt with the same themes, including a number of photographs. Take It Like a Man was a best-seller in the UK.

In 2005, Century published Straight, his second autobiographical book, this time written with author Paul Gorman. It was in The Sunday Times best-seller list for six weeks. This latter autobiography starts off where the former had stopped, though the two works are different in style, due to their different co-authors, and all of the chapters have a title in the 2005 book, while the 1995 autobiography only featured numbered sections.

Awards

Discography 

 Sold (1987)
 Tense Nervous Headache (1988)
 Boyfriend (1989)
 The Martyr Mantras (1991)
 Cheapness and Beauty (1995)
 The Unrecoupable One Man Bandit (1999)
 U Can Never B2 Straight (2002)
 Yum Yum (2004)
 Ordinary Alien (2010)
 This Is What I Do (2013)
 This Is What I Dub, Vol. 1  (2020)
 Cool Karaoke, Vol. 1 (2021)

Filmography

Bibliography

References

Further reading

 De Graaf Kasper, Garret Malcolm (1983), When Cameras Go Crazy, London, UK, Virgin Books & New York, NY, USA, St. Martin's Press;  (Culture Club's official biography)
 Boy George with Spencer Bright (1995), Take It Like a Man, London, Sidgwick & Jackson (Boy George's first official autobiography)
 Boy George with Paul Gorman (2004), Straight, London, Century (Boy George's second official autobiography – republished in 2007 with updates – first edition includes EP of the same name)

External links

 
 
 

1961 births
20th-century English male singers
20th-century English singers
20th-century English male writers
21st-century English male singers
21st-century English singers
21st-century English male writers
20th-century English memoirists
21st-century English memoirists
20th-century English LGBT people
21st-century English LGBT people
Bow Wow Wow members
Club DJs
Culture Club members
English autobiographers
English Buddhists
English DJs
English expatriates in the United States
English new wave musicians
English people convicted of assault
English people convicted of drug offences
English people of Irish descent
English pop singers
English male singer-songwriters
English prisoners and detainees
English record producers
English soul singers
English gay musicians
British gay writers
Grammy Award winners
LGBT Buddhists
LGBT DJs
Gay memoirists
British LGBT singers
Gay songwriters
Gay singers
English LGBT songwriters
Living people
Male new wave singers
Musicians from Kent
Nichiren Buddhists
People from Eltham
People from Woolwich
Participants in American reality television series
Singers from London
20th-century squatters
The Apprentice (franchise) contestants
Virgin Records artists
Writers from London
Members of Sōka Gakkai
I'm a Celebrity...Get Me Out of Here! (British TV series) participants
Androgynous people